Andrew Nicholas Bond (born 13 September 1978) is an Australian former first-class cricketer.

Bond was born at Melbourne in September 1978. He studied in England at St Catherine's College at the University of Oxford. While studying at Oxford, he made a single appearance in first-class cricket for Oxford University against Glamorgan at Oxford in 1999. Bond batted once in the match, scoring 6 runs in Oxford's first-innings before he was dismissed by Mike Powell, while with his right-arm medium pace bowling, he took the wickets of David Harrison and Ismail Dawood in Glamorgan's second-innings, finishing with match figures of 2 for 74.

References

External links

1978 births
Living people
Cricketers from Melbourne
Alumni of St Catherine's College, Oxford
Australian cricketers
Oxford University cricketers